Ferrari GT: Evolution is  a racing game by Gameloft Bucharest based on up to 33 different cars, all manufactured by Ferrari.  Races take place on the Fiorano Circuit and seven imaginary road circuits, each based on an actual city.

Gameplay
There are two game modes: Quick Race where the player chooses the car, racing location, and race type; and Career mode, where the player participates in trials, friendly competitions, adversarial challenges, and scheduled racing competitions.

External links
 Ferrari GT: Evolution for iPhone and iPod Touch
 Ferrari GT: Evolution mobile

2008 video games
Ferrari video games
Head-to-head arcade video games
Racing video games
Gameloft games
IOS games
Mobile games
DSiWare games
Symbian games
Video games developed in Romania
Video games set in Italy